The 2006 Minsk Summit was a Commonwealth of Independent States summit in Minsk, Belarus on November 28, 2006. Officially, the theme of the summit was focused on "questions of the effectiveness and improvement of the commonwealth", thereby addressing complaints by some member states that the CIS had become little more than a forum. The summit coincided with NATO's 2006 Riga Summit in Latvia.

References

Commonwealth of Independent States
2000s in Minsk
2006 in Belarus
Diplomatic conferences in Belarus
21st-century diplomatic conferences
2006 in international relations